Agabar is a sizeable town in the Maroodi Jeex region of Somaliland. It is located in the northeastern side of Gabiley District.

Demographics
The total population of Agabar is 6,547 and is primarily inhabited by people from the Somali ethnic group, with the Jibril Abokor (Bahabar Adan) sub divisions of the Sa'ad Musa subclan of the Habar Awal Isaaq.the traditional residents of this town.

See also
Administrative divisions of Somaliland
Regions of Somaliland
Districts of Somaliland

References

Populated places in Maroodi Jeex